Markides or Markidis is a Greek surname that may refer to:
Constantinos C. Markides (born 1960), Cypriot management educator and business theorist
Kyriacos C. Markides (born 1942), American sociologist

Greek-language surnames
Surnames
Patronymic surnames
Surnames from given names